Mariusz Nosal (born 13 October 1974) is a Polish former professional footballer who played as a forward. He made one appearance for the Poland national team in 1999.

Notes

References

External links
 
 

1974 births
Living people
People from Zamość
Polish footballers
Association football forwards
Poland international footballers
Ekstraklasa players
Górnik Zabrze players
Odra Wodzisław Śląski players
Wisła Płock players
AEK Larnaca FC players
Polish expatriate footballers
Polish expatriate sportspeople in Cyprus
Expatriate footballers in Cyprus